Osvaldo Lima is a former international football player and former coach of the São Tomé and Príncipe national football team.

References

Living people
São Tomé and Príncipe national football team managers
Year of birth missing (living people)
Place of birth missing (living people)
São Tomé and Príncipe football managers